Dezhou University is a public university in Shandong, China. It was founded in 1971. In the year 2021, the number of students was around 25000.

Ranking 
It ranks 378th on China mainland university ranking of 2022.

See also 

 Dezhou

Links 

 Homepage

References 

Educational institutions established in 1971